Dennis Setzer (born February 27, 1960) is an American professional stock car racing driver. He has driven in all three of NASCAR's top series, scoring eighteen wins in the Camping World Truck Series.

Beginnings
Setzer made his NASCAR debut in the Busch Series in 1991 in the All Pro 300. He started 5th in his own #4 Ford Thunderbird, but crashed on lap nine and finished 40th. He ran another race the following year, at Hickory Motor Speedway in a car owned by Bill Davis. He wrecked in that race as well but still managed to finish 26th. In 1993, he ran four races for Daniel Welch, and had a top-ten run in the Advance Auto Parts 500. He was also a notable competitor in the Sportsman Division.

Sprint Cup Series

Setzer got a job in Bill Elliott's secondary rides, the 13 and the 89 in 1998. Sponsorship was provided by Elliott's team, which was McDonald's McRib and FirstPlus Financial. In Setzer's 8 attempted starts, he posted 1 DNQ, 1 DNF and a best finish of 19th at Talladega Superspeedway. After a 4-year absence, Setzer returned to the Winston Cup Series in 2002. He lined up with Travis Carter, owner of his own ailing team, Haas-Carter Motorsports. Setzer drove his #66 Discover Card-sponsored Ford at New Hampshire International Speedway and DNQ'd. That would be his only start of the year. In 2003, he would try again at Martinsville Speedway in Hermie Sadler's #02 GoTeamVA.com-sponsored Chevrolet. Setzer failed to qualify for the event. He returned in 2009, driving the Romeo Guest Construction #46 Dodge at Martinsville Speedway owned by Carl Long. He failed to qualify once again. In 2010 Setzer formed a relationship with Brian Keselowski of K-Automotive Motorsports, leading him to make a start for him in Cup. He raced at Martinsville Speedway in his #92 Dodge but failed to qualify again. In 2011 he expanded his schedule to 4 races for Keselowski. He broke the spell of failing to qualify when he successfully qualified the 92 at Bristol Motor Speedway, and finished 38th. Setzer failed to qualify in his other 3 2011 starts, including his last ever attempted race in the Sprint Cup Series at Martinsville Speedway.

Busch Series
Setzer made his first full-time run in 1994, driving the No. 59 Alliance Training Centers-sponsored Chevrolet for Welch once again. Setzer won in his 23rd career start at South Boston Speedway, then won again two races later at Hickory Motor Speedway. By the end of the year, he was ninth in points and was runner-up to Johnny Benson for Rookie of the Year. In 1995, the team switched to Fords; Setzer struggled in the adjustment. After he won the pole at the Milwaukee Mile, he was released from the ride, and spent the rest of the season making fill-in starts. At the same time, he began running part-time in the newly formed Craftsman Truck Series. He finished second in his debut at Milwaukee, along with seven other starts that year.

In 1996, he signed to drive the No. 38 Lipton Tea-sponsored Ford for Akins-Sutton Motorsports. Despite two Top 10 finishes, he was released from the ride, and spent he rest of the year driving the Mark III Financial car. He started the 1997 season in that ride, but was released after five races, and spent the rest of the season in the No. 43 Lance Snacks-sponsored Chevy owned by David Ridling, posting four Top 10's and finishing 19th in points.

Truck Series
After 1997, Setzer did not have a ride for 1998. He started the season doing work for Gloy-Rahal Motorsports in the Trucks, but only for a handful of races. After three DNF's in the Busch Series, Setzer was selected by K Automotive Racing to replace driver/team owner Bob Keselowski, who had been injured in a wreck. Setzer had eighth-place finishes in the truck while filling in. After that, he signed with Bill Elliott Racing, replacing Jerry Nadeau for eight races. His best finish in seven starts (he DNQ'd at Dover) was 19th at Talladega Superspeedway. After a brief hiatus from the trucks, Setzer returned to K Automotive to finish the season, and collected a win at Mesa Marin Raceway.

In 1999, K Automotive provided Setzer with a full-time ride in the #1 Mopar-sponsored Dodge Ram. Setzer won three races and was in the thick of the championship hunt, but an early wreck at the season finale at California Speedway took him out of the running. Nevertheless, he was named the series' Most Popular Driver for 1999. His performance slipped in 2000, as he won just one race and dropped to seventh in points. After that season, he left the team.

Recent years
In 2001, Setzer joined Morgan-Dollar Motorsports. In his first year with the team he won two poles, one race, and finished ninth in points. After another quiet year in 2002, things started improving, as Setzer won three races in 2003. Setzer went on a tear, finishing a career-best second in the point standings for three seasons in a row (2003, 2004, & 2005). After failing to win a race in 2006, he departed Morgan Dollar to join Spears Motorsports. In 2007, Setzer won the City of Mansfield 250 at Mansfield Motorsports Speedway after running the entire 250 lap race without a pitstop. The Mansfield victory was his first victory in 41 races, his last coming in the Power Stroke Diesel 200 at O'Reilly Raceway Park on August 1, 2005.

Late in the 2007 season, he parted ways with Spears and raced at New Hampshire for Green Light Racing, and at Las Vegas for Bobby Hamilton Racing. He drove the #18 Dodge Ram Truck to a victory in the 2008 Kroger 250 at Martinsville. It was Setzer's 18th career win, and BHR's first win since Bobby Hamilton Sr. won in Mansfield in 2005. Furthermore, it was the final win for the Dodge nameplate in the Truck Series before they pulled out of NASCAR following 2012. After BHR shut down at the end of 2008, Setzer found himself out of a job entering the season.

Setzer began the 2009 Truck Series season driving one race apiece for GunBroker Racing and Fast Track Racing Enterprises, before being named the driver for MRD Motorsports. He had two second-place finishes and was in the Top 10 in points before he was forced to miss six races due to sponsorship issues. Setzer also returned to K-Automotive in the Nationwide Series, driving the #96 ConelyAuto.com-sponsored Dodge on a part-time basis before moving to the other team car, #92.

During the 2010 Aaron's 312 Nationwide Series race in Talladega on the last lap, Setzer, driving the #92, was involved in a huge crash which sent him up the wall and into the catch fence. He then hit a fence pole and spun around, and with a fiery explosion, landed on all four wheels. Setzer was okay after the crash.

Setzer did not have a full-time ride to begin 2011. In March, he was named a substitute driver for Brian Keselowski in the Sprint Cup Series, who was recovering from gallbladder surgery. Setzer successfully qualified for the Bristol race, his first Cup series event since 1998. He went on to finish 38th, the team's best finish to date. Brian Keselowski has since returned to action. After several weeks, Setzer began driving the cars for Jay Robinson Racing in the Nationwide Series. Setzer also attempted a handful of races with ML Motorsports and R3 Motorsports. As of late October, his best finish of the year has been 18th at Road America. Setzer was to attempt the fall cup race at Martinsville, but qualifying was rained out and the field was set by owner's points, and Setzer and his K-Automotive Motorsports team went home.

Motorsports career results

NASCAR
(key) (Bold – Pole position awarded by qualifying time. Italics – Pole position earned by points standings or practice time. * – Most laps led.)

Sprint Cup Series

Nationwide Series

Camping World Truck Series

 Season still in progress
 Ineligible for series points

ARCA SuperCar Series
(key) (Bold – Pole position awarded by qualifying time. Italics – Pole position earned by points standings or practice time. * – Most laps led.)

Images

References

External links
 

Living people
1960 births
People from Newton, North Carolina
Racing drivers from North Carolina
NASCAR drivers
NASCAR team owners